Jabal Kafraa (also spelled Jabal Kafr Ra' or Jabal Kifra') is a mountain near Kafraa in the Hama Governorate in Syria. It has an elevation of 625 meters (2,051 feet) and is located near Jabal Zayn al-Abidin, it ranks as the 30th highest mountain in Hama and the 540th highest in Syria.

References 

Mountains of Hama Governorate